Uğrak can refer to the following villages in Turkey:

 Uğrak, Alanya
 Uğrak, Bayburt
 Uğrak, Beşiri
 Uğrak, Bismil
 Uğrak, Çorum
 Uğrak, Dicle
 Uğrak, İnebolu